Lady Is The Boss is a 1983 Shaw Brothers kung fu-comedy film directed by Lau Kar-leung and starring Kara Hui.

Plot 
Wang Hsieh Yun (Lau Kar Leung) is the current teacher of a kung fu school in Hong Kong. However it is the 80’s and people are not interested in "old school" kung fu anymore. He receives a letter telling him to pick up the schools boss from the airport which much to his surprise is Chan Mei Ling (Kara Hui). Mei Ling is the daughter of the schools' master, thus making her the "de facto" boss. She is very much Americanized and begins making changes at the school and taking in her father's students–Li Hon Man (Gordon Liu), Cheuk Jin Shing (Hsiao Ho), Wong Yuen Shuei (Robert Mak Tak Law), Ng Ming Fat (David Cheung Chin-pang) and Ah Wing (Wong Yue)–off the street, discos, and bars, which angers the traditionalist Wang. Eventually Mei Ling gets in trouble with a local gang headed up by Big Boss (Johnny Wang Lung Wei), and after provoking a fight at bar owned by Big Boss, Wang is forced to rescue her and teach Big Boss and his thugs a slight lesson. This forces Big Boss to retaliate until a fight breaks out in a local gym in which Big boss is defeated and Mei Ling eventually returns to the U.S. after realizing Wang should be in charge of the school.

Cast 
 Lau Kar Leung - Wang Hsieh Yun
 Kara Hui - Mei Ling
 Gordon Liu - Lee Hon Man
 Hsiao Ho - Cheuk Jin Shing
Robert Mak Tak-Law - Wong Yuen Shuei
David Cheung Chin-pang - Ng Ming Fat
Wong Yue - Ah Wing
Johnny Wang Lung Wei - Big boss

Reception 

LoveHKFilm gave the film a mildly positive review: "An interesting premise is basically squandered due to slapdash plotting, but some likeable performances and solid action choreography, particularly in the finale, sweeten the experience considerably."

References

External links 
 Lady Is the Boss at Hong Kong Cinemagic
 

1983 films
Shaw Brothers Studio films
Kung fu films
Films directed by Lau Kar-leung
Hong Kong martial arts comedy films
1980s Hong Kong films